Jackie Vaughn III (November 17, 1917 – September 13, 2006) was a Democratic member of both houses of the Michigan Legislature for over three decades.

Born in Birmingham, Alabama, in 1917, Vaughn moved to Detroit in 1944. He studied at Oberlin and Hillsdale colleges before being a Fulbright Scholar and fellow at Oxford University. Vaughn was elected to the Michigan House of Representatives in 1966 and served six terms before his election to the Michigan Senate.

One hallmark of his tenure was the establishment of a holiday in Michigan to honor Martin Luther King Jr. He was also known for his devotion to the Hartford Memorial Baptist Church. He was also elected president pro tempore of the Senate in 1983, becoming the first African-American to hold the position, and was later named associate president pro tempore.

Vaughn suffered a stroke in 2000 after checking himself into the hospital in Lansing and was excused from Senate session for the remaining two years of his term. When he left the Senate in 2002, the Senate recognized him as having "'fought the good fight' on behalf of the people of Detroit," and that his "consistent efforts on behalf of young people, his tireless leadership in promoting the work of Dr. Martin Luther King, and his advocacy of programs to help the needy have earned him widespread respect."

Vaughn was a member of Omicron Delta Kappa, the Elks, and a Freemason. He died on September 13, 2006, aged 88.

References

1917 births
2006 deaths
Politicians from Birmingham, Alabama
Politicians from Detroit
American Freemasons
African-American state legislators in Michigan
Alumni of the University of Oxford
Oberlin College alumni
Hillsdale College alumni
Democratic Party Michigan state senators
Democratic Party members of the Michigan House of Representatives
20th-century American politicians
21st-century American politicians
Burials at Woodlawn Cemetery (Detroit)
20th-century African-American politicians
21st-century African-American politicians